Year 194 (CXCIV) was a common year starting on Tuesday (link will display the full calendar) of the Julian calendar. At the time, it was known as the Year of the Consulship of Septimius and Septimius (or, less frequently, year 947 Ab urbe condita). The denomination 194 for this year has been used since the early medieval period, when the Anno Domini calendar era became the prevalent method in Europe for naming years.

Events 
 By place 
 Roman Empire 
 Emperor Septimius Severus and Decimus Clodius Septimius Albinus Caesar become Roman Consuls.
 Battle of Issus: Septimius Severus marches with his army (12 legions) to Cilicia, and defeats Pescennius Niger, Roman governor of Syria.  Pescennius retreats to Antioch, and is executed by Severus' troops.
 Septimius Severus besieges Byzantium (194–196); the city walls suffer extensive damage.

 Asia 
 Battle of Yan Province: Warlords Cao Cao and Lü Bu fight for control over Yan Province; the battle lasts for over 100 days.
 First year of the Xingping era during the Han Dynasty in China.

 By topic 
 Art and Science 
 Galen writes his manual on pathology, The Art of Curing (approximate date).

 Religion 
 Irenaeus declares Gnostic doctrines to be heretical (approximate date).

Births 
 Sun Huan (or Jiming), Chinese general (d. 234)
 Zhu Ju, Chinese official and general (d. 250)

Deaths 
 Liu Yan, Chinese warlord and governor
 Ma Midi, Chinese official and politician 
 Pescennius Niger, Roman usurper (b. 140)
 Tao Qian, Chinese warlord and governor (b. 132)

References